Piveteauia is an extinct genus of prehistoric coelacanth fish which lived during the Lower Triassic period. The type specimen was discovered in the Middle Sakamena Group in northwestern Madagascar by French paleoichthyologist Jean-Pierre Lehman.

References

Whiteiidae
Prehistoric lobe-finned fish genera
Triassic bony fish
Prehistoric animals of Madagascar
Fossil taxa described in 1952